Denny Flynn (born April 21, 1951) is an American former professional rodeo cowboy who specialized in bull riding. He is from Charleston, Arkansas.

Career
In 1969, Flynn won the Arkansas High School All-Around rodeo title. He earned his Professional Rodeo Cowboys Association (PRCA) card in 1973. In 1975, in Salt Lake City, Utah, he was gored by a bull. The horn penetrated ten inches into his body, missing his heart by a half-inch. He rode to the hospital in a truck holding his wound in his hands. In 1979, in Palestine, Illinois, Flynn rode Steiner's Red Lightning for a score of 98 out of 100. This broke the previous record for roughstock competition, and is now the second-highest ever recorded ride score in PRCA history for a roughstock event. He qualified for the National Finals Rodeo (NFR) ten times, winning the event average three times. In 1981, he suffered a concussion on his sixth ride, but managed to ride 9 of 10 bulls to win the championship. In 1983, he broke an ankle on his ninth bull ride. He needed to ride a tenth bull to win, so he rode it with his broken ankle.

Honors
 2002 PBR Ring of Honor
 2010 ProRodeo Hall of Fame
 2010 Rodeo Hall of Fame of the National Cowboy & Western Heritage Museum
 2017 Bull Riding Hall of Fame
 2019 Arkansas Sports Hall of Fame.

Retirement
He retired at the age of 34 in 1985. When Red Lightning retired in 1987, Flynn rode one more ceremonial ride on the bull that almost killed him in Salt Lake City.

References

ProRodeo Hall of Fame inductees
Professional Bull Riders: Heroes and Legends
Bull riders
Sportspeople from Arkansas